Abdul Latif Chowdhury (25 May 1913 – 16 January 2008), widely known as Saheb Qiblah Fultali, was a Bangladeshi Sufi Islamic scholar and theologian who is the founder of the Fultali movement.

Early life and background
Abdul Latif Chowdhury was born into a noble Bengali Muslim Sufi family in the village of Fultali, Zakiganj, Sylhet Division, Bengal Presidency (now Bangladesh), British India.

His lineage is the following: Abdul Latif Chowdhury, son of Abdul Majid Chowdhury, son of Shāh Muhammad Hiron, son of Shāh Muhammad Dānish, son of Shāh Muhammad Sadeq, son of Shāh Muhammad Elāhi Bakhsh, son of Shah Muhammad Alā Bakhsh. Ala Bakhsh was a descendant of Shāh Kamāl Yemenī, a later companion of Shāh Jalāl, According to Fultali's biographers, Bakhsh contributed to Ahmad Sirhindi's opposition movement against the Mughal emperor Akbar's theological opinions such as the Din-i Ilahi.

Education
Fultali received his basic education from his own family. He was taught by his cousin, Fatir Ali, while studying at primary school. He was then admitted to Fultali Alia Madrasah, where he studied qirat and tajweed. In 1336 AH (1918 CE), Fultali enrolled in Rangauti Madrasah and studied there, successfully completing higher secondary education.

In 1338 AH (1920 CE), he enrolled into the Badarpur Senior Madrasah in Karimganj. For higher education, he studied Fanunnat at Rampur Alia Madrasah in Uttar Pradesh and studied various Islamic sciences. He then enrolled into Matlaul Ulum Madrasah to specialise in Hadith. He studied there for a few years and obtained first class, first position in the final Hadith exam in 1355 AH (1936 CE). He also attained degrees in Tafsir and Fiqh.

By 1355 AH (1936 CE), Fultali studied and obtained ijazah for Hadith after achieving outstanding results in the faculty of Hadith, he obtained first class honours. He also acquired masters in Ilm-e-Tafsir and Ilm-e-Fiqh. By the age of 18, Fultali had ijazah in the four principal tariqahs from his spiritual master Shah Muhammad Yaqub Badarpuri, who was a disciple of Hafiz Ahmad Jaunpuri. Fultali also studied the Quran with Tajwid (recitation) in Mecca.

Career
In 1940, Fultali founded the Darul Qirat Majidiah Trust and institutionalized his effort to teach the perfect recitation of the Quran. Now there are more than two thousand branches of the trust throughout the world engaged in educating people in the field of Tajweed. As a result of riots in the 1950s, Fultali briefly migrated to Pakistan.

Abdun Nur Ali (1880-1963) of Gorkapon in Badarpur was a Mawlana who requested Abdul Latif Chowdhury Fultali to visit the mosque conjoined to Adam Khaki's shrine. In 1946, Fultali announced that he would be travelling to Badarpur to give a lesson on qira'at at Adam Khaki's mosque. Abd an-Nur Gorkaponi and his students purchased a horse for the scholar to ride on so the journey could be easier. Afterwards he joined the then Satpur Alia Madrasah and Isamati Alia Madrashah as a Muhaddith and taught Hadith.

Fultali was the best known and most influential spiritual leader among the British Bangladeshi community. He was based in Bangladesh, but made well-attended visits to the United Kingdom. Among these visits, In 1978, he established Madrasah-e-Darul Qirat Majidiah UK, which has since vastly expanded (now known as Darul Hadis Latifiah) in London. He was a founder of numerous organisations related to religion, culture and education and a patron to a number of humanitarian and charitable organisations.

Organisations
Darul Qirat Majidiah Fultali Trust 
Anjumane Al Islah, Bangladesh
Anjumane Al Islah, United Kingdom
Anjumane Al Islah, United States
Bangladesh Anjuman-e-Talamiz-e-Islamia
Anjuman-e-Madaris-e-Arabia
Darul Hadis Latifiah
Darul Qirat Majidiah, United Kingdom
Latifiah Qurra Society, United States
Latifiah Qurra Society, United Kingdom
Latifiah Qari Society, Bangladesh
Latifiah Yatim Khana, Bangladesh<ref
name="portal"></ref>
Ulama Society, United Kingdom
Al Islah Youth Forum, United Kingdom
Darul Hadis Latifiah North West United Kingdom

Death
On Thursday 16 January 2008 at 2:10 am, Fultali died at his home in Subhanighat, Sylhet due to natural causes. His janazah (Islamic funeral) took place the day after his death following Asr prayer led by his eldest son. Reports in Bangladesh estimate that between 2 and 2.5 million attended his janazah. It is also estimated that further hundreds of thousands of people joined the janazah across the Indian border.

An urs and mehfil (gathering) is held on the anniversary of Allama Saheb Qiblah Fultali's death every year at his village in Fultali and many other places around the world by his students and followers.

Books
Al-Qawl as-Sadeed fi al-Qir’at wa at-Tajweed, a comprehensive guide to the rule of correct Qur'anic recitation. Composed originally in Urdu, it has been translated in Bengali and English.
At-Tanweer ala at-Tafsir, an in-depth elucidation of Surah Al-Baqarah.
Muntakhab-us Siyar, the biography of Prophet Muhammad in three volumes.
Anwar as-Salikeen, an Urdu work in the field of Tasawwuf, explaining the different stages of the path for the seeker, and elucidating on how to nurture oneself in preparation for the sacred path.
Shajara-e-Tayyibah, the names of the spiritual masters of the Tariqahs Chisti, Qadiri, Naqshbandi and Mujaddidiyya.
Al-Khutbah al-Ya’qubiyyah, a compilation of khutbahs (sermons) in Arabic, including the khutbah for the two ‘Eids (Islamic festivals) and the khutbah for Nikah (marriage). Named after his father-in-law, Hatim Ali Yaqub Badarpuri (d. 1958 CE).
Nala-e-Qalandar, an Urdu compilation of ode in veneration of the Prophet Muhammad and the Awliya.
Nek A'mal, a work in Bengali, elucidating on good actions and the rewards gained for action upon them.

See also
Badedeorail Fultali Kamil Madrasa
Brick Lane Mosque
Darul Hadis Latifiah
Al-Islah Mosque

References

External links
 Mujahid Islam Bulbul, Biography of Allama Saheb Qibla Fultali (R.A.)
 Allamah Fultali Sahib Qiblah. Ahl-e Muhabba. 17 January 2010
 Bangladeshi diaspora in the UK
 
 Darul Qirat Majidia Fultali trust
 Salam Media UK
 Shahjalal Mosque & Islamic Centre, Manchester
 Latifiah Northwest, UK
 Darul Hadis Latifiah, UK
 Hazrat Shahjalal Darussunna Yakubia Kamil (M.A) Madrasah
 Parwana | National Bangla Monthly

Bangladeshi Sufis
Bangladeshi Sunni Muslim scholars of Islam
1913 births
2008 deaths
Bangladeshi non-fiction writers
20th-century Muslim theologians
Sunni imams
People from Zakiganj Upazila
People from British India
People of East Pakistan
20th-century Bangladeshi writers
20th-century imams
21st-century imams
20th-century non-fiction writers
20th-century Bengalis
21st-century Bengalis
Bangladeshi people of Arab descent
Bengali Muslim scholars of Islam